The United States Space Forces Korea (USSPACEFORKOR) is the United States Space Force component field command to the United States Forces Korea. Headquartered in Osan Air Base, South Korea, it plans, coordinates, supports, and conducts employment of space operations across the full range of military operations, including security cooperation, in support of the sub-unified command's objectives. It was activated on 14 December 2022.

History

Director of Space Forces, Seventh Air Force 
USSPACEFORKOREA's presence in the United States Forces Korea traces back to the director of space forces (DIRSPACEFOR) construct before the establishment of the Space Force. When the Space Force was still Air Force Space Command, there would be a space operations officer called the DIRSPACEFOR in every air service component command that would advise the air component commander on matters relating to space operations. As such, there was a director of space forces assigned to Seventh Air Force.

List of directors of space forces 

 Lt Col Joshua M. McCullion, May 2021 – 14 December 2022

Establishment 
USSPACEFORKOR was activated on 14 December 2022.

List of commanders

See also 
 United States Forces Korea
 United States Space Force
 Seventh Air Force

References 

United States Space Force
United States Space Force personnel